Teuthowenia is a genus of glass squid in the subfamily Taoniinae. Members of this genus are characterized by their deep-sea habitat, clear bodies, and ability to engorge themselves with water to become larger when threatened. Each known species has a visible digestive gland, which serves a similar purpose as a stomach and liver.

The genus contains bioluminescent species.

It includes three species:
Teuthowenia maculata (Leach, 1817) - found in the tropical waters of the eastern Atlantic Ocean.
Teuthowenia megalops (Prosch, 1849) - found in the subarctic, temperate, and (rarely) subtropical waters of the northern Atlantic Ocean.
Teuthowenia pellucida (Chun, 1910) - found throughout the oceans of the southern hemisphere.

References

External links

Tree of Life web project: Teuthowenia

Squid
Bioluminescent molluscs
Taxa named by Carl Chun